The Wainwright Prize is a literary prize awarded annually for the best work of general outdoors, nature and UK-based travel writing. In 2020 it was split into the Wainwright Prize for UK nature writing and the Wainwright Prize for writing on global conservation, with separate longlists and judging panels. It is restricted to books published in the UK. For three years from 2022 the prizes will be sponsored by Kendal paper-makers James Cropper plc and known as the James Cropper Wainwright Prizes. A prize for writing for children was introduced in 2022, the three prizes being the James Cropper Wainwright Prize for Nature Writing, the James Cropper Wainwright Prize for Writing on Conservation and the James Cropper Wainwright Prize for Children's Writing on Nature and Conservation.

The prizes celebrates the legacy of British guidebook writer Alfred Wainwright. The prize was established by Frances Lincoln Publishers and The Wainwright Society, in association with The National Trust. It was originally sponsored by Thwaites Brewery, who produced a beer called Wainwright Ale and was later sponsored by Marston's Brewery, who took over Thwaites' production of Wainwright Golden Beer, and sometimes referred to as  The Wainwright Golden Beer Book Prize. In 2020 the prize was no longer sponsored, but was supported by an anonymous benefactor and was "in association with the National Trust". In 2021 the Kendal papermakers James Cropper plc became the prize's "headline sponsors" in a three-year agreement.

The prize was first awarded in 2014 to Hugh Thomson for his The Green Road Into The Trees: A Walk through England. The winner received a cheque for £5,000. With the introduction of two prizes in 2020 the prize money was shared between the two winners, and in 2022 it was increased to £7,500 to be shared between the three winners.

Winners and shortlisted titles
In the following table, the years correspond to the date of the ceremony, rather than when the book was first published. Entries with a blue background and an asterisk (*) next to the writer's name have won the award; those with a pale background are the other nominees on the shortlist.

  *   Winners

References

External links

Outdoor literature awards
British literary awards
Awards established in 2013
2013 establishments in the United Kingdom